Kijevci (etymologically connected to Kyiv) is a toponym that may refer to:

Kijevci, Bosanska Gradiška, in Bosnia and Herzegovina
Kijevci (Sjenica), in Serbia

See also
Kijevac (disambiguation)
Kijevo (disambiguation)